This article details the Leeds Rhinos's rugby league football club's 2022 season. They were coached by Richard Agar until May 2022, Jamie Jones-Buchanan as an interim coach and Rohan Smith from April 2022 onwards. The Rhinos competed in both the 2022 Betfred Super League and the 2022 Challenge Cup.

Super League

Regular Season

Matches

Table

Playoffs

Challenge Cup

Club vs Country

Squad

Transfers

Gains

Losses

References

External links
Official Club site
Principal fan site and forum
Super League Site
Leeds Rhinos Dedicated section on RugbyLeague.com
Leeds Rhinos History
Rugby League Project - Super League XXVII 2022 - Leeds Rhinos

Leeds Rhinos seasons
2022 in English rugby league
Super League XXVII by club
Rugby